Scheibler is a  high mountain in the Verwall Alps in the Austrian state Tyrol.

There are directs ascents from two alpine club huts:
 From Darmstädter Hütte (2384 m, east of Scheibler) in two hours.
 From Konstanzer Hütte (1688 m, north-west of Scheibler) in three hours.
Both ascents meet at Kuchenjöchli, the  col between Scheibler and Kuchenspitze.

References 

Mountains of the Alps
Mountains of Tyrol (state)
Two-thousanders of Austria
Verwall Alps